Vincent Marc Thierry Lauwers (born 12 September 1967) is an Australian round-the-world yachtsman. In 2000 he became the first paraplegic sailor to sail solo, non-stop around the world. In 2001, he won the Laureus Award for "Sportsperson of the Year with a Disability".

Early life
Vinny Lauwers was born in Belgium on 12 September 1967 and emigrated to Australia at the age of four.
He first experienced ocean sailing aged 14, crewing on a yacht from Melbourne to Sydney.
He became a paraplegic in 1990, when he was 22; Lauwers' back was broken in three places after he was hit by a car.

Before his circumnavigation Lauwers gained extra experience in the Melbourne to Osaka Yacht Race, a non-stop south to north, double-handed race, covering a 5500 nautical mile course between the two sister cities and also sailing in two Sydney to Hobart Yacht Races with the Sailors with disability (SWD) crew, including SWD's first entry in 1994.

Circumnavigation
Lauwers spent seven years planning his voyage and building his yacht, a Van de Stadt-designed 47 named Vision Quest.

He was instructed for two years on the synoptics of the Southern Hemisphere by meteorologist Bob Leighton who, together with colleagues from the Australian Bureau of Meteorology's National Meteorological Operations Centre, also provided regular forecasts during Lauwers' journey.

His circumnavigation attempt commenced on 20 December 1999   from Port Phillip Bay in Melbourne, Australia.
During his voyage he encountered many hardships. Equipment problems included autopilot malfunctions, failed radar, and a self-destructing wind generator.

The voyage took seven and a half months, finishing on 9 August 2000. Welcome celebrations were planned for Lauwers to finish his voyage on Saturday 12 August, but with a gale developing in Bass Strait, he decided to enter the Bay and cross the official finish line on the 9th. He anchored and stayed on board until continuing on to the Williamstown Pier and planned celebrations.
His official welcome home at the Royal Yacht Club of Victoria was attended by over a thousand people including Premier Steve Bracks.
Vision Quest's World Sailing Speed Record Council's Performance Certificate lists its route time as 233 days 13 hours 43 minutes and 8 seconds and the distance covered as 21760 nautical miles.

Honours
On 15 August 2000, Lauwers and his feat were recognised in the Australian Parliament. He was awarded the Australian Sports Medal in July 2000 and in January 2001, the Australian Centenary Medal "for outstanding service as the first paraplegic sailor to sail around the world unassisted".

In 2000 Lauwers was nominated for the International Sailing Federation (ISAF) World Sailor of the Year Awards. Lauwers was Australian Sailing's Sailor of the Year with a Disability for 2000–01 and shared the Yachting Victoria's Sailor of the Year Trophy in 2001.

In 2001 Lauwers was awarded the Laureus World Sports Award for Sportsperson of the Year with a Disability. At the awards ceremony, where he was presented with his statuette by New Zealand sailor Sir Peter Blake and French footballer David Ginola, Lauwers joked that his wife allowed him a mistress "and she’s 48 foot long, 15 foot wide and has all the right curves."

On 25 May 2001, he was awarded the P&O Nedlloyd Disabled Sailor of the Year accolade.

In 2002 a  DVD video, "The spirit of vision quest : the Vinny Lauwers story", was released.

Speaking of his crew members such as Lauwers and Liesl Tesch, founder of Sailors with Disabilities, David Pescud said, "People are people first and your disability is either part of your life; it owns you or you own it. The guys I sail with, they own their disability and I’ve been very fortunate that I’ve sailed with some of the most amazing people."

References

1967 births
Living people
Australian male sailors (sport)
Australian people of Belgian descent
Belgian emigrants to Australia
Laureus World Sports Awards winners
People with paraplegia
Recipients of the Australian Sports Medal
Recipients of the Centenary Medal
Single-handed circumnavigating sailors
Sportspeople from Melbourne